Geelong Church of England Girls' Grammar School, The Hermitage was founded in 1906. It was first proposed in a meeting between the Archbishop of Melbourne, Henry Lowther Clarke, and the Head Master of Geelong Church of England Grammar School, L.H. Lindon and opened with Sidney Austin as first Chairman Council and Elsie Morres as first Headmistress.

The Hermitage, a mansion in Newtown built for the Armytage family, was bought for £6,000 with the same amount being spent on wiring and furnishing the building and constructing an assembly hall. The school advanced the education of girls in Australia in many ways including being the first girls' school to have a uniform and to have compulsory team sports. The curriculum combined academic subjects, crafts, and home economics, aiming to provide both what Miss Morres thought of as a serious education as given to boys and those things the families expected their girls to learn to be good wives.

In 1970, Krome House, the new middle school, was opened in Highton and in 1973 the rest of the school moved to the site. In 1976 C.E.G.G.S. "The Hermitage" amalgamated with Geelong Church of England Grammar School and Clyde School, which continue to-day as Geelong Grammar School.

Headmistresses 
 Miss Elsie Morres (1906 - 1933)
 Miss Anne Peterson (1933 - 1942)
 Miss Victoria Krome (1942 - 1962)
 Mrs F.L. Coggin (1962 - 1968)
 Miss Elizabeth Britten (1968 - 1975)

Houses 
Mottoes in brackets

 Austin (Honour above honours)
 Morres (The chain is as strong as its weakest link)
 School (Play up, play up, and play the game)
 Volum (Non sibi, sed toti) Not for self, but for all

Coo-ee School Journal 
Journal of The Hermitage published from 1910 until the school's amalgamation with Geelong Grammar School and Clyde School in 1976. Its title is shared with the school song, also Coo-ee.

References

Educational institutions established in 1906
Schools in Geelong
Private schools in Victoria (Australia)
1906 establishments in Australia
Defunct schools in Victoria (Australia)
Geelong Grammar School
1976 disestablishments in Australia
Educational institutions disestablished in 1976